Hsu Fu Chi (徐福记) is a Chinese company, based in Dongguan, China, that manufactures various confectionaries, biscuits, chocolates, jellies, sachima, and snacks. The company is majority owned by Nestlé, and minority owned by the Hsu family.

History

Beginnings and independent growth

In 1992, Mekey Hsu Chen founded Hsu Fu Chi in The People's Republic of China. In 1994, the brand was trademarked in the PRC. In 1997, Transpac invested in the company, and  the brand became the top-selling brand in  China  for ten years;  in 2008, they were relegated to the number 2 position, after Mars, Inc. Hsu Fu Chi was the first company to   introduce the "Pick and Mix" format in China, in which consumers can pick various kinds of confectionaries out of tubs of various confectionaries; and instead of picking only one kind, one can pick as many as they wish.

In 2000, Hsu Fu Chi began to build a distribution network across China. In 2004, they created the world's first fully automated sachima plant. They were listed on a stock exchange in Singapore in 2006: the SGX ST in 2006, one of the first Chinese confectionery companies to be listed on a stock exchange, and the first to be listed on the SGX.

They opened their newest factory, one in Zhumadian, China; in 2010. Over five years, from 2007 to 2012, their profits grew 17%.

Acquisition by Nestlé

In 2011, the company entered talks with several undisclosed companies for the sale of the company. On 11 July 2011, Nestlé, the largest food company in the world, paid $1.7 billion for a 60 percent stake in Hsu Fu Chi International, which is about 3.3 times the sales figures of Hsu Fu Chi for the stake. Nestlé agreed to buy 43.5 percent of Hsu Fu Chi's shares at S$4.35. If the scheme was approved by independent shareholders, Nestlé would then acquire a 16.5 percent stake from the Hsu family, which would leave them with 40 percent.

On 6 December 2011,  the government of the People's Republic of China, and the government of The Cayman Islands (where the company was incorporated) accepted Nestlé's bid, and allowed Nestlé to proceed in its acquisition.   Currently, Nestlé owns 60% of the company, and the Hsu family currently owns 40%.

References

Nestlé
1992 establishments in China
Food and drink companies of China
Food and drink companies established in 1992
Chinese companies established in 1992
Companies based in Dongguan